James McLintock Donaldson (born 24 December 1958) is a former  footballer who first signed up as a senior with Dumbarton. However, after two seasons, and being unable to earn a regular first team place, he joined the junior ranks and signed for Blantyre Vics before going on to play for Baillieston. Here he was spotted by Alloa Athletic in 1985, and went on to have 3 successful seasons with them.

References

1958 births
Scottish footballers
Dumbarton F.C. players
Alloa Athletic F.C. players
Scottish Football League players
Living people
Association football midfielders
Scottish Junior Football Association players
Baillieston Juniors F.C. players
Blantyre Victoria F.C. players